Walter Watkins Vrooman (1869 – 2 December, 1909) was an American socialist educationalist who co-founded Ruskin College with Charles A. Beard in 1899. He then returned to America, where he set up a second Ruskin College in Trenton, Missouri.

Walter was the son of Judge Hiram Perkins Vrooman and Sarah Buffington. Carl Schurz Vrooman was his younger brother. The family moved to Baltimore, Maryland, where another brother, Hiram Greeley Vrooman, joined the Associate Reformed Church and became a preacher. He also founded the Union for Public Good in conjunction with B. O. Flower. Amne Grafflin was attracted to this organisation and accepted the position of secretary. She was the heiress to George Grafflin, who was a dry goods and fertilizer merchant. Shortly after he died, Amne married Walter in February 1897.

The Grafflin inheritance
George W. Grafflin had died intestate in November, 1896. His estate was valued as being between $600,000 and $1,000,000. Amne announced her proposed marriage to Vrooman in January 1897. Her brother William Grafflin was very upset by this. As Vrooman was living in St. Louis, where Amne would shortly join him, Amne agreed to give William power of attorney for her. As William had been a partner in the company with his deceased father, this was to enable him to deal with day to day issues of the company. However after she moved to St Louis, she regretted this decision, but when she attempted to have the power of attorney rescinded, the court refused to do so.

Works
 Dynamic Religion, Baltimore: Patriotic Literature Publishing co. (1895)
 [https://babel.hathitrust.org/cgi/pt?id=uc2.ark:/13960/t1fj2sk2g&view=1up&seq=250 Government ownership in production and distribution: being an account of 337 now existing national and municipal undertakings in the 100 principal countries of the world], Baltimore: Patriotic Literature Publishing co. (1895)
 The New Democracy: A Handbook for Democratic Speakers and Workers, St Louis: Witt Printing Co. (1897)

References

1869 births
American socialists
1909 deaths